Pamicogrel is a cyclooxygenase inhibitor that was under development for its anti-platelet-aggregation effects.

References

External links
 

COX-2 inhibitors
Phenol ethers
Thiazoles
Pyrroles
Ethyl esters